KOAY (88.7 FM) is a radio station licensed to serve the community of Middleton, Idaho. The station is owned by the Idaho Conference of Seventh-Day Adventists, Inc. It airs a rhythmic leaning Christian CHR format.

The station was assigned the call sign KTYY by the Federal Communications Commission on September 24, 2007. The station changed its call sign to KOAY on April 9, 2010.

References

External links
Official Website

OAY (FM)
Radio stations established in 2010
2010 establishments in Idaho
Canyon County, Idaho